The County of Apulia and Calabria, later the Duchy of Apulia and Calabria, was a Norman state founded by William of Hauteville in 1042 in the territories of Gargano, Capitanata, Apulia, Vulture, and most of Campania. It became a duchy when Robert Guiscard was raised to the rank of duke by Pope Nicholas II in 1059.

The duchy was disestablished in 1130 when the last duke of Apulia and Calabria, Roger II, became King of Sicily. The title of duke was thereafter used intermittently as a title for the heir apparent to the Kingdom of Sicily.

Creation

William I of Hauteville, who returned in September 1042 in Melfi, was recognized by all the Normans as supreme leader. He turned to Guaimar IV, Prince of Salerno, and Rainulf Drengot, Count of Aversa, and offered both an alliance. With the unification of the two Norman families, Altavilla and Drengot, Guaimar offered official recognition of the conquests and at the end of the year, an assembly of Lombards and Norman barons at Melfi met with Rainulf and William, which ended at the beginning of the following year (1043).

In this meeting, Guaimar IV of Salerno ensured the Hauteville dominance over Melfi. William of Hauteville formed the second core of his possessions and differentiated himself from Rainulf I of Aversa, head of the territories of Campania. All the barons present offered a tribute as a vassal to Guaimar, which recognized William I of Hauteville as the first of the title of Count of Apulia. To tie it to himself, he offered to marry Guaimar's niece Guide, daughter of Guy, Duke of Sorrento. Guaimar reconfirmed the title of count to Rainulf as well, which created the County of Puglia.

In 1047, Drogo of Hauteville was made "count" of Apulia & Calabria by Emperor Henry III, with territories lost by Guaimar IV of the Principality of Salerno.

Duchy of Apulia and Calabria

In 1043, the prince of Salerno Guaimario V had been acclaimed Duke of Apulia and Calabria, although the legitimacy of this title (as it was not officially recognized by any universal power) could be considered juridically doubtful; in fact in 1047 the emperor Henry III intervened to claim the ducal title.

However, after 1059 the county was officially named Ducato di Puglia e Calabria ("Duchy of Apulia and Calabria"), because Robert Guiscard was named "Duke" by the Pope Nicholas II.

Salerno was conquered in 1077 by the Normands and since then was no more the capital of the Principality of Salerno: these territories were added to the Duchy of Apulia & Calabria. With this conquest the Normans controlled all continental southern Italy, with the exception of the small Duchy of Naples.

The next year the Duchy's capital was moved from Melfi to Salerno and started to look at the conquest of Sicily: the Normands in this way created the precursor of the Kingdom of Sicily, the first unified state in southern Italy that was founded in 1130.

Salerno remained the capital of this southern Italian political entity for half a century (from 1078 to 1130), when the city flourished with the Schola Medica Salernitana.

List of counts and dukes
William is usually considered the first count of Apulia and Calabria. In 1047, Holy Roman Emperor Henry III took away Guaimar's ducal title.  He christened William's brother and successor Drogo Dux et Magister Italiae comesque Normannorum totius Apuliae et Calabriae and made him a direct vassal of the emperor.

Counts
William I Iron Arm 1042–46
Drogo 1046–51
Humphrey 1051–57
Robert Guiscard 1057–59

Dukes
Robert Guiscard 1059–85
Roger I Borsa 1085–1111
William II 1111–27

In 1127 the duchy passed to the count of Sicily. It was thereafter used intermittently as a title for the heir apparent.

Roger II 1127–34, also king of Sicily (1130–54)
Ranulf 1137–39, candidate of Pope Innocent II and Lothair II, Holy Roman Emperor
William III 1148–54, also king of Sicily (1154–66)
Roger IV 1154–61, son of previous

The title was left vacant after the death of Roger IV. It may have been revived for a short-lived son of William II:
Bohemond 1181

It was revived by King Tancred for his eldest son in 1189:
Roger V 1189–93

See also
 Province of Apulia and Calabria

References

Chalandon, Ferdinand. Histoire de la domination normande en Italie et en Sicile. Paris: 1907.
Houben, Hubert (translated by Graham A. Loud and Diane Milburn). Roger II of Sicily: Ruler between East and West. Cambridge: Cambridge University Press, 2002.
Matthew, Donald. The Norman Kingdom of Sicily. Cambridge: Cambridge University Press, 1992.
Norwich, John Julius. The Normans in the South 1016–1130. London: Longman, 1967.
Norwich, John Julius. The Kingdom in the Sun 1130–1194. London: Longman, 1970.
Takayama, Hiroshi. The Administration of the Norman Kingdom of Sicily. BRILL, 1993.

External links
History of the Norman World

Apulia
Medieval Apulia
11th-century establishments in Italy
Apulia and Calabria

Apulia and Calabria
Apulia and Calabria